Elizabeth Gwaunza (born 1953) is a Zimbabwean lawyer and jurist who has been Deputy Chief Justice of the Supreme Court of Zimbabwe since March 2018.

Early life and education
Gwaunza was born in 1953. She was one of two black female law students who were the first to graduate in Zimbabwe. She has a Diploma in Women's Law from the Women's Law Centre at the University of Zimbabwe and a masters in Women and Gender Development from the Women's University in Africa.

Career
Gwaunza was admitted as a legal practitioner of the High Court of Zimbabwe in 1987. From 1989 until 1995 she co-founded and was the national coordinator of the Women and Law in Southern Africa Research Project. She worked as a director of Legal Aid in the Ministry of Justice and as a director of Legal Affairs in the Ministry of Community Development and Women's Affairs. She was a funding member and former president of the Zimbabwe Association of Women Judges and is a member of the International Association of Women Judges. She has written a number of publications on family and inheritance law.

Gwaunza was appointed a Judge of the High Court by Robert Mugabe in August 1998, and then the Supreme Court in November 2002. She was elected to the International Criminal Tribunal for the former Yugoslavia in 2008. Her appointment was questioned by the International Bar Association given her ties to Mugabe, including the gift of a farm seized from white owners.

Gwaunza was appointed Deputy Chief Justice of the Supreme Court by President Emmerson Mnangagwa in March 2018. She is the second woman to sit on the Supreme Court after Vernanda Ziyambi. In May 2021, the High Court ruled that Mnangagwa's constitutional amendment extending the retirement age of judges from 70 to 75 did not apply to sitting judges, meaning Luke Malaba ceased to be a judge as he turned 70 that week, and the Judicial Service Commission announced Gwaunza was Acting Chief Justice with immediate effect. The government appealed the ruling, and Malaba returned to work while the matter was pending, but skipped most public ceremonies, leaving Gwaunza to preside.

Selected publications

Personal life
Gwaunza is married and has a daughter. Her youngest son, Musah, a journalist, died from illness at age 33 in 2016.

References

External links
 ICTY Interview

Living people
1953 births
University of Zimbabwe alumni
Zimbabwean women lawyers
20th-century Zimbabwean judges
21st-century women judges
21st-century Zimbabwean judges
Women chief justices
Judges of the Supreme Court of Zimbabwe
International Criminal Tribunal for the former Yugoslavia judges